Oan Schylge is the anthem of Terschelling, one of the West Frisian Islands in the northern Netherlands. The lyrics were written in 1854 by Jacob Sijbrands Bakker in the West Frisian dialect spoken on the island. "Schylge" is the name of Terschelling in local Frisian, and "Oan Schylge" means "To Terschelling". The origin of the music is uncertain: It was perhaps composed by Hendrik Rotgans (1851–1910), but could also have been borrowed from an older folk song. At most occasions, only the first and the last verse are sung.

Original text 
Oan Skîllinge.
(Skîlger tongslag.)

O Skîlge mîn lândje
Wat hab ik di jeaf,
O wa di net prîset
Di fînt mi toch deaf;

Dan slût ik mîn eeren,
Of geet it te bont,
Dan kan ik net swîje,
Mar straf se terstont.

O Skîlge mîn lândje!
Soa droeg en soa heag,
Wat leisto dir frolik
De Noardsé în 't eag.

Hoa trots bin dîn dunen
Hoa wît is dîn sân,
Hoa grien bin dîn helmen
Mîn jeaf Skîlgerlân.

O Skîlge mîn lândje,
Do leist mi oan 't hart,
Wa di net ris prîset,
Di dogt di te kort.

Soa lang asto steetste,
Soa fest op dîn sân,
Wæs fol brave minsken
Mîn jeaf Skîlgerlân!

J. S. Bakker.

Some other text and translation

References

Regional songs
Terschelling
West Frisian language
1854 songs
Dutch anthems
Dutch-language songs